The South Manila Inter-Institutional Consortium (SMIIC), formerly known as the Inter-Institutional Consortium (IIC) is a group of higher educational institutions in the southern portion of Manila. The purpose of the consortium is to collaborate actively to effect social transformation by promoting the cause of education and by making quality and relevant learning accessible to as many as possible.

History
Established in 1974, the IIC is composed of five schools located along Taft Avenue, Malate,  Manila, Philippines. To date, it has accomplished a number of projects and activities to maximize the institutional resources among its member schools.

In its over two decades of existence, the consortium has been led by the Board of Responsibles composed of the presidents of the member institutions namely, Adamson University (AdU), De La Salle University (DLSU-Manila), the Philippine Christian University (PCU), St. Scholastica's College (SSC), the Philippine Normal University (PNU), and St. Paul University-Manila (SPUM). Its activities and projects have been implemented by the standing committees through the Council of Liaisons in cooperation with the other members of the consortium.

Service Areas
The consortium has five service areas that implement projects. These are the Extension Services that promote civic responsibility, Student Services Development that promote excellence and quality education, Curriculum and Instructions that continuously share information, training and resources to improve curriculum and instruction, Faculty and Administrative Staff Development that ensure excellence in faculty academic preparation, competency and effectiveness and Research and Publications that monitors and supervises the conduct of SMIIC research projects and other publications. Recently, the Extension Service Committee of the Consortium had chosen to work together in order to share the Consortium's best practices for poverty alleviation in Northville 4, Marilao, Bulacan.

Membership
Adamson University
De La Salle–College of Saint Benilde
De La Salle University
Emilio Aguinaldo College
Lyceum of the Philippines University
Philippine Christian University
Philippine Normal University
Philippine Women's University
Santa Isabel College Manila
St. Paul University Manila
St. Scholastica's College
University of the Philippines Manila

 
College and university associations and consortia in the Philippines
Education in Metro Manila